is a Japanese light novel series written by Liz Takayama and illustrated by keepout. It began serialization online in July 2015 on the user-generated novel publishing website Shōsetsuka ni Narō. It was later acquired by Media Factory, who have published eight volumes since January 2016 under their MF Books imprint. A manga adaptation with art by Sei Takano has been serialized online via Kadokawa Shoten's ComicWalker website since November 2016. It has been collected in eight tankōbon volumes. An anime television series adaptation by Diomedéa aired from July to September 2022.

Synopsis
In his life-long obsession to develop new medicines to help people, Kanji Yakutani, a Japanese medical researcher, dies from overwork. To his immense surprise, he finds himself reborn in another world with a medieval culture, in which proper medical treatments are an affordable privilege to the wealthy only. In his new life as Pharma de Médicis, he discovers that he has been granted a divine blessing from Panactheos, the God of Medicine. With his divine blessing and his retained knowledge of modern medicine, Pharma decides to revolutionize the other world's medical advancements and make proper treatments affordable for the common folk. But as one medical emergency follows another, Pharma also has to learn what it means to really live in his new life.

Characters

A 10-year-old boy who is the otherworldly reincarnation of Kanji Yakutani, a world-famous medical researcher at T University who created countless medical advances and medicines to counter any sickness. After losing his younger sister Chi to an incurable brain tumor during his childhood, Yakutani became obsessed with pharmaceutical research and development of new medicines, which he did exemplary. This drive caused him to die from heart attack due to overwork and fatigue at the age of 31, but he is reincarnated into a medieval world into the renowned de Médicis noble family in the San Fleuve Empire. When he awakens in his reincarnated self, he was told he was previously in a coma due to being struck by lightning and is now acting differently than how he used to be prior to the incident. The Divine Art bestowed upon him allows Pharma to create water and, thanks to his knowledge in chemistry, other basic elements, and to perceive medical anomalies, but he was given Elementless ability, which is quite rare, unlike the original Pharma who used only Water based spells and skills. He bears a scar on his shoulder as a visible sign of his blessing by Panactheos, and he no longer casts a shadow, which was solved when the Church's bishop gave him an artifact to produce a shadow, alongside the church's hidden staff that only usable by the person blessed and made Apostle by the Medicine God.

Pharma's personal tutor and a talented pharmacist who passed her first-grade exam at the age of fifteen. Has so many glasses to replace those she lost. She joins her student in building his dreams.

A 9-year-old maid servant of the De Médicis family and Pharma's childhood friend. Later on, she joins her master as a pharmacy clerk. Her natural talent at painting later gets her a royal sponsorship by Empress Elizabeth as an artist.

Ruler of the San Fleuve Empire. After Pharma saves her from the - previously believed incurable - "white sickness", she gives the de Médicis honors and allows Pharma to build his dream pharmacy. Her Divine Art is Fire, but her divine mark is incomplete, giving her less power.

The patriarch of the de Médicis family, an archduke, and Pharma's father. He is also the president of the Sain Fleuve's Imperial School of Pharmacy, and later the governor of the port of Marseirre. At first, he does not trust the reborn Pharma until the latter shows his worth by healing the Empress with his unusual medical knowledge. Like Pharma, his Divine Skill is with Water. A brilliant pharmacist in his own right, he is, however, hobbled by the limitations of his world's medical knowledge.

Pharma's 4-year-old younger sister, whom Pharma healed from her chickenpox.

A high-ranking inquisitor, and later archbishop, of the Diocese of Panactheos, the leading religious order of the San Fleuve Empire. Initially antagonistic towards Pharma, believing him to be a demon, he has since become a close ally after Pharma has proven his worth.

A former pharmacist and member of the Imperial School of Pharmacy, and a former friend of Bruno de Médicis. While a genius in the field of infectious diseases, he is amoral and twisted. For conducting abominable experiments on live human subjects, he was branded by the Diocese, which sealed his Divine Art away, and banished from San Fleuve.

The master of the Saint Fleuve Pharmaceutist Guild, the only institution in the empire for licensing pharmacists in the empire until Pharma succeeds in winning Empress Elizabeth's favor. Mostly out of jealousy, he begins sabotaging Pharma's efforts to open apothecaries for the common people, resorting to even outright vicious methods. During the Black Death incident, he and the other guild leaders stubbornly refuse to accept Pharma's cures and therefore all die from the disease; this and the ineffectiveness of their traditional remedies causes the lower guild ranks to flock to Pharma for assistence, which is readily given.

Production
Yūshi Kojima, who is a pharmacist, joins the production of the manga adaptation as a "pharmacy supervisor".

Media

Light novels

Manga

Anime
An anime television series adaptation was announced on July 15, 2021. The series is produced by Diomedéa and directed by Keizō Kusakawa, with Wataru Watari in charge of series' scripts, Mayuko Matsumoto designing the characters, and Tatsuya Kato and Satoshi Hōno composing the music. It aired from July 10 to September 25, 2022, on AT-X, Tokyo MX, Kansai TV, and BS NTV. The opening theme song is "Musō-teki Chronicle" by Kaori Ishihara, while the ending theme song is "Haku'u" by Little Black Dress. Crunchyroll licensed the series outside of Asia, and has also began streaming an English dub starting on July 24, 2022. Muse Communication licensed the series in Taiwan, South and Southeast Asia

Episode list

Reception
The light novel and manga together have over 2,300,000 copies in print.

References

External links
  at Shōsetsuka ni Narō 
  
  
  
 

2016 Japanese novels
Anime and manga based on light novels
Crunchyroll anime
Diomedéa
Fiction about reincarnation
Isekai anime and manga
Isekai novels and light novels
Japanese webcomics
Kadokawa Dwango franchises
Kadokawa Shoten manga
Light novels
Light novels first published online
Medical anime and manga
Muse Communication
Seinen manga
Shōsetsuka ni Narō
Webcomics in print